Charles L. Coffin of Detroit was awarded  for an arc welding process using a metal electrode.  This was the first time that metal melted from the electrode carried across the arc to deposit filler metal in the joint to make a weld. Two years earlier, Nikolay Slavyanov presented the same idea of transferring metal across an arc, but to cast metal in a mold.

References 

American inventors
Year of birth missing
Year of death missing